John C. Houlihan (October 31, 1910 – July 31, 1986) was a Republican who became the 43rd mayor of Oakland, California.

He was elected mayor in 1961, through his defeat of incumbent Mayor Clifford D. Rishell, and was subsequently re-elected to a second, four-year term of office in 1965.  He resigned in 1966 after being charged with embezzlement. Houlihan was sent to prison for more than two years after pleading guilty to taking almost $100,000 from an estate he was handling as an attorney. He was paroled in 1969 and pardoned by Ronald Reagan in 1973.

Houlihan died at age 75 after a lengthy illness.

References

1910 births
1986 deaths
Mayors of Oakland, California
American politicians convicted of fraud
California politicians convicted of crimes
20th-century American politicians